Elizabeth T. Danforth is an illustrator, editor, writer, and scenario designer for role-playing games and video games. She has worked in the game industry continuously since the mid 1970s.

Early life and education
She received her BA in Anthropology from Arizona State University, and her MLS from the University of Arizona.

Creative work

Flying Buffalo hired Danforth as a staff artist and for production work in 1978, and published her magazine Sorcerer's Apprentice (1978–1983) for 17 issues. While employed with Flying Buffalo, Danforth is noted for editing and developing the Fifth Edition of Flying Buffalo's flagship role playing game, Tunnels & Trolls. She reprised this role in 2013 for the new edition, Deluxe Tunnels & Trolls.

Danforth is known primarily as a freelance artist in the fantasy and science fiction genres, with the majority of her body of work illustrating for the game industry between 1976 and 2004. She has created book covers, maps, and illustrations for many of the significant game publishers including Wizards of the Coast, TSR, Inc, Alderac Entertainment Group, FASA Corporation, Iron Crown Enterprises, GDW, and more. She produced over 50 pieces of art for the collectible card game Magic: the Gathering (produced by Wizards of the Coast) as well as an equal quantity of illustrative artwork for the Middle-earth Collectible Card Game, Legend of the Five Rings, and many others. Her maps and illustrations appear in novels and anthologies from Bantam Spectra, Tor Books, DAW Books, and St Martin's Press.

She has freelanced for the computer game industry, developing scenarios for Wasteland, Wasteland 2, and two licensed Star Trek computer games from Interplay. She worked on Interplay's Meantime which was never released. She was the lead developer for New World Computing's Tunnels & Trolls computer game, and worked on projects with Electronic Arts.

At the 1995 Origins Awards, held in July 1996, Danforth was inducted into the Academy of Gaming Arts and Design's Hall of Fame. The Academy is the creative arm of GAMA, the Game Manufacturer's Association. She is a lifetime member of ASFA, the Association of Science Fiction and Fantasy Artists. In 2014, she was chosen by vote as a "famous game designer" to be featured as the king of hearts in Flying Buffalo's 2014 Famous Game Designers Playing Card Deck.

Danforth has been guest of honor at numerous science fiction conventions over the past 30 years, including Cascadia Con, the North American Science Fiction Convention held in Seattle in 2005.

Other work includes:
Irish Country series (novels by Patrick Taylor; publisher Macmillan Publishers/St Martin's Press: maps
 Battletech Collectible Card Game (FASA Corporation): card artist
 Cheysuli and Sworddancer (novels by Jennifer Roberson; publisher DAW Books): maps
 Dragon Crown War (novel by Michael A. Stackpole; publisher: Bantam Spectra; 2002): map
 Highwaymen: Robbers and Rogues (anthology edited by Jennifer Roberson; publisher: DAW Books; 1997): illustrator
 Legend of the Burning Sands (Five Rings Publishing): card artist
 Legend of the Five Rings Collectible Card Game (Alderac Entertainment): card artist
 Lord of the Rings Adventure Game and Middle-earth Role Playing (I.C.E.): illustrator of numerous books and modules.
 Magic: the Gathering: card artist in Legends, Ice Age, Fallen Empires, Homelands, Alliances, Coldsnap, Mirage, Time Spiral, and in the Unhinged parody set. Her art appears in Magic: The Gathering Online as well as on several promotional cards.
 Of Dice and Pen (anthology by editor Fred Poutre; publisher: Flying Pen Press, 2008): short story
 Spirit Gate (novel by Kate Elliott; publisher: Tor Books, 1997): maps
 Wasteland (1988 video game from Interplay): scenario designer
 Star Trek: 25th Anniversary (1992 video game from Interplay): scenario designer
 Star Trek: Judgment Rites (1993 video game from Interplay): scenario designer
 Tunnels & Trolls Fifth Edition (publisher: Flying Buffalo Inc, 1979): editor, developer and illustrator
 Crusaders of Khazan (video game, New World Computing, 1990): lead writer/designer

Danforth continues to do art and illustration in a freelance capacity. She has been tapped to provide scenarios and design work for Wasteland 2.

Academic work
Danforth completed a master's degree in Information and Library Science (University of Arizona, 2008), and was one of a dozen hand-selected "gaming experts" who participated in the American Library Association's million-dollar grant-funded project to explore how gaming can be used to improve problem-solving and literacy skills, and to develop a model gaming "toolbox" for gaming in libraries. Ten libraries nationwide were selected to receive a onetime grant of $5,000 with funds used to expand on or add literacy-based gaming experiences at the library for youth ages 10–18.

From May 2009 to December 2011, Danforth wrote the "Games, Gamers and Gaming" blog and column for Library Journal as an advocate and popularizer of games in libraries. She speaks at professional and fan conferences, and at libraries on gaming-related topics. Based in Arizona, she continues to do freelance art and writing.

References

External links
 
 Games, Gamers and Gaming blog
 Verizon Foundation press release on the gaming in libraries project
 

Year of birth missing (living people)
American game designers
American speculative fiction artists
American video game designers
Fantasy artists
Interplay Entertainment people
Living people
Role-playing game artists
Science fiction artists
Video game writers
Women science fiction and fantasy writers
Women video game designers